Alfred Carl Harris (born December 31, 1956) is a former American college and professional football player who was a defensive end and linebacker in the National Football League (NFL) for twelve seasons during the 1970s, 1980s and 1990s.  He played college football for Arizona State University, and earned All-American honors.  He was a first-round pick in the 1979 NFL Draft, and played professionally for the Chicago Bears and Philadelphia Eagles of the NFL.

Early years

Harris was born in Bangor, Maine.  He attended Leilehua High School in Wahiawa, Hawaii.

College career

He attended Arizona State University, where he played for the Arizona State Sun Devils football team from 1975 to 1978.  As a senior in 1978, he was a consensus first-team All-American.

Professional career

The Chicago Bears chose Harris in the first round (ninth pick overall) in the 1979 NFL Draft. Harris sat out the entire 1985 season due to a contract dispute with the Bears, and missed being part of one of the most dominating Super Bowl teams of all time.

Harris returned in 1986, but a hamstring injury and the contract dispute still lingered over his tenure with the Bears, and he signed a free agent contract with the Philadelphia Eagles in the off-season in 1989.  He played two years with the Eagles before retiring.

Coaching career

He was dismissed by the San Francisco 49ers on December 27, 2010, after 49ers President Jed York fired head coach Mike Singletary.

References

1956 births
Living people
All-American college football players
American football defensive ends
American football linebackers
Arizona State Sun Devils football players
Chicago Bears players
Sportspeople from Bangor, Maine
Philadelphia Eagles players
Players of American football from Maine